This is a list of terms which are used, or have been used in the past, to designate the residents of specific provinces of the Philippines. These terms sometimes overlap with demonyms of ethnic groups in the Philippines, which are also used as identifiers in common parlance.

* denotes an endonym, i.e., a name from the area's indigenous language(s).

See also

Demonym
List of adjectival and demonymic forms of place names
List of adjectivals and demonyms for astronomical bodies
List of adjectivals and demonyms for continental regions
List of adjectivals and demonyms for subcontinental regions
List of adjectival and demonymic forms for countries and nations
List of adjectivals and demonyms for Australia
List of adjectivals and demonyms for Canada
List of adjectivals and demonyms for India
List of adjectivals and demonyms for Malaysia
List of adjectivals and demonyms for Mexico
List of adjectivals and demonyms for New Zealand
List of adjectivals and demonyms for the Philippines
List of adjectivals and demonyms for the United States
List of adjectivals and demonyms for cities
List of adjectivals and demonyms for former regions
List of adjectivals and demonyms for Greco-Roman antiquity
List of adjectivals and demonyms for fictional regions

References

Notes

Philippines
Demonyms
Demonyms